The New York City Department of Citywide Administrative Services Police (NYC DCAS Police) is responsible for providing onsite security services to the New York City Department of Citywide Administrative Services (DCAS),  to enforce state and city laws at all 53 facilities owned, leased and/or operated by the New York City Department of Citywide Administrative Services.

They conduct preliminary investigations of accidents, building rule violations, criminal complaints, security breaches, and thefts of both city and personal property. DCAS Police special officers develop and implement corrective and preventive measures. They assist in operational and emergency planning in partnership with other DCAS Lines of Service and other emergency response agencies during emergency conditions. DCAS Police manage and administer the contract guard agreement to ensure necessary staffing levels and compliance with the contract provisions on DCAS managed properties.

The New York City Police Department respond to all incidents that occur at NYC department of City Administrative Service facilities, they are the primary Policing and investigation agency within the New York City as per the NYC Charter (law).

History 
The New York City Department of Citywide Administrative Services was created in 1996 when then Mayor Rudy Giuliani merged the Department of General Services and the Department of Personnel.  The New York City Department of Citywide Administrative Services (DCAS) is the department of the government of New York City that manages, leases and purchases city real property; operates manages and repairs courthouses and other city-owned public buildings; administers an energy conservation program; purchases supplies, materials and equipment for use by city agencies; is responsible for citywide fleet management including operation and maintenance of a motor vehicle pool; and supports government recruitment. It also publishes The City Record, the official journal of New York City. Its regulations are compiled in title 55 of the New York City Rules.  The Department of Citywide Administrative Services Law Enforcement branch  was started in 1996 with approximately 5 peace officers assigned to various DCAS facilities.

DCAS Special Officer
The New York City Department of Citywide Administrative Services has a law enforcement branch to protect tenants and visitors at properties owned, leased and operated by New York City Department of Citywide Administrative Services by maintaining a uniformed presence to screen, detect and apprehend individuals who violate general criminal laws of New York City and New York State.  

DCAS special officers provide onsite security service at DCAS's 53 facilities throughout the 5 Boroughs, protect DCAS' property, personnel and members of the public.

Power and authority
DCAS Special Patrolmen are appointed in connection with special duties of employment, and such designation confers limited Peace Officer powers upon the employee pursuant to New York State Criminal Procedure Law § 2.10(27). The exercise of these powers is limited to the employee's geographical area of employment and only while such employee is actually on duty as listed in Chapter 13 subsection (C): Special Patrolmen 

NYC DCAS special officer's can be promoted to the position of Sergeant by a civil service exam, Lieutenant, and Captain by appointment.

Equipment 
A small number of DCAS special officers are armed with a firearm, after receiving a carry guard license from the NYPD (as special officers for on duty use only) and must follow their rules and regulations. 

DCAS Special Officers are also equipped with expandable baton, Handcuffs, Flashlight, bullet resistant vest, pepper spray,  and a radio that is directly linked to dispatch and other officers.

Rank structure 
There are seven titles (referred to as ranks) in the New York City Department of Citywide Administrative Services Police:

See also 
 Law enforcement in New York City
 New York City Department of Citywide Administrative Services
 New York State Department of Civil Service

References

External links 
 New York City Department of Citywide Administrative Services
 Department of Citywide Administrative Services in the Rules of the City of New York

Department of Citywide Administrative Services Police
Specialist police departments of New York (state)